The 2013 Prix de l'Arc de Triomphe was a horse race held at Longchamp on Sunday 6 October 2013. It was the 92nd running of the Prix de l'Arc de Triomphe.

The winner was Treve, a three-year-old filly trained in France by Criquette Head-Maarek and ridden by Thierry Jarnet.

Treve started second favourite in the race. The field was a strong one, including Orfevre, Ruler of the World, Kizuna, Intello, Al Kazeem and Leading Light. Treve was ridden by Thierry Jarnet as Frankie Dettori had broken his ankle in a fall at Nottingham Racecourse. Treve sweated up badly before the race and started poorly.
Treve made ground rapidly on the outside and took the lead in the straight before accelerating clear of the field to win easily by five lengths from Orfevre and Intello.

Result

Group I - 4 800 000€ - Qatar Prix de l'Arc de Triomphe - Plat - - SOUPLE - 17 

Rank	
	
1	Treve	F3	15	54,5	T. Jarnet	5.8/1	2'32"04

2	Orfevre	M5	8	59,5	C. Soumillon	2.3/1	5	

3	Intello	M3	9	56	O. Peslier	10/1	Encolure	

4	Kizuna	M3	11	56	Y. Take	7.6/1	2	lire

5	Penglai Pavilion	M3	10	56	M. Barzalona	54/1	
	
6	Al Kazeem	M5	18	59,5	J.W. Doyle	19/1	2
	
7	Ruler Of The World	M3		R.L. Moore	13/1	Courte tête	

8	Flintshire	M3	7	56	M. Guyon	21/1	3/4	

9	Going Somewhere	M4	4	59	G. Benoist	103/1	Nez
	
10	Very Nice Name	M4	1	59,5	P. Convertino	102/1	
	
11	Joshua Tree	M6	14	59,5	R. Hughes	149/1		

12	Meandre	        M5	2	59,5	U. Rispoli	81/1		

13	Haya Landa	F5	17	58	F. Blondel	146/1	
	
14	Pirika	        F5	3	58	P.C. Boudot	82/1		

15	Leading Light	M3	5	56	G. Mosse 	15/1	
	
16	Ocovango	M3	13	56	S. Pasquier	58/1		

17	Sahawar	M3	16	        56  	T. Thulliez	133/1

Subsequent breeding careers
Leading progeny of participants in the 2013 Prix de l'Arc de Triomphe.

Sires of Classic winners
Orfevre (2nd)
 Epoca d'Oro – 1st Satsuki Shō (2018)
 Lucky Lilac – 1st Queen Elizabeth II Cup (2019)
 Authority – 1st Aoba Sho (2020)
 Gilded Mirror – 3rd NHK Mile Cup (2020)

Sires of Group/Grade One winners
Intello (3rd)
 Intellogent – 1st Prix Jean Prat (2018)
 Louis d'Or – 3rd Prix du Jockey Club (2018)
 Slalom – 2nd Grand Prix de Paris (2019)
 Regal Reality – 3rd Eclipse Stakes (2019)
Ruler of the World (7th)
 Iridessa – 1st Fillies' Mile (2018), 1st Matron Stakes, 1st Pretty Polly Stakes (Ireland), 1st Breeders' Cup Filly & Mare Turf (2019)
Al Kazeem (6th)
 Aspetar – 1st Preis von Europa (2019)

Other stallions
Kizuna (4th) – Maltese Diosa (1st Tulip Sho 2020)Ocovango (14th) – Langer Dan – 1st Wensleydale Juvenile Hurdle (2019)Joshua Tree (13th) – Minor flat and jumps winnersLeading Light (12th) – Minor flat and jumps runnersVery Nice Name (16th) – Minor flat runnersFlintshire (8th) – Exported to America – Offspring yet to raceMeandre (10th) – Exported to Czech Republic

Broodmares
Pirika (15th) – Minor winner in JapanHaya Landa (17th) – Minor winner in JapanTreve (1st) – Offspring yet to race

References

External links
Full Race Details at Racing Post
Full Race Video
Colour Chart – Arc 2013

Prix de l'Arc de Triomphe
 2013
2013 in French sport
2013 in Paris
October 2013 sports events in France